Jake Dylan Wood (born 12 July 1972) is an English actor and podcaster, known for his role as Max Branning in the BBC soap opera EastEnders. He has also made guest appearances in series including Only Fools and Horses and Red Dwarf. In 2014, Wood competed on BBC's Strictly Come Dancing alongside professional dancer Janette Manrara. In the United States, he is known as the voice of the GEICO gecko. In 2018, he began co-hosting Pound for Pound, a boxing podcast with Spencer Oliver.

Early life
Wood was born in Westminster, London to an English father and a French mother. He attended City of London Academy Highbury Grove and trained as an actor at the Anna Scher Drama School in Islington, North London.

Career
His first acting role was in the 1984 television series The Gentle Touch. He has since appeared in several television series including May to December, Minder, Only Fools and Horses, Nightingales, Murder in Mind, Press Gang, London's Burning, Casualty, Sean's Show, Inspector Morse Driven to Distraction 1989, One Foot in the Grave, Red Dwarf, A Touch of Frost, The Bill, Le Café des Rêves, Sea of Souls, Doc Martin and The Thin Blue Line. He has appeared in the films Crimetime (1996) with Stephen Baldwin, Tube Tales (1999), The Aryan Couple (2004) and The Illusionist (2006) opposite Edward Norton. Wood starred in the 1989 Yellow Pages TV Advert, entitled "Party Party" and, until 2015, was the voice of the GEICO gecko advertisements on American television. Wood also featured alongside Cobent CTO and ex-Metal Hammer journalist Tony Dillon as part of a team presenting Click, a computer games magazine on video in the early 1990s. In 1989, Wood appeared in Only Fools and Horses as an assistant for Rodney Trotter (Nicholas Lyndhurst), in the episode The Jolly Boys' Outing. In the 8th series of Red Dwarf he played Kill Crazy, a prison inmate. Wood also played the eldest son, Dougie, in sitcom family The Wilsons.

In March 1990, Wood portrayed the role of Jackson in the BBC soap opera EastEnders, a minor character who met Diane Butcher (Sophie Lawrence) while she was sleeping rough on the streets of London. Wood was later cast to play the regular character Max Branning from June 2006 to February 2021. In 2014, Wood took part in the 12th series of Strictly Come Dancing. He was partnered with Janette Manrara, reaching the semi-final. In May 2015, Wood announced that he would be taking a year-long break from EastEnders. Wood said "I have been at EastEnders for nine years and I feel the time is right to give Max a break. It won't be for too long as I shall be back next year to see Max face another chapter of drama."

In January 2018, Wood started hosting a boxing podcast, Pound for Pound, with Spencer Oliver. In September 2020, it was announced that Wood would be departing from the cast of EastEnders after fifteen years in the role, with Max being written out as part of an "explosive exit". His final appearance aired on 19 February 2021.

Personal life
Wood is a fan of Arsenal and took part in the 2007 Great North Run. He lives with his wife, Alison, whom he married in 2001, and their two children, Buster and Amber.

In 2019, he ran the London Marathon with some of his EastEnders co-stars for a Dementia campaign in honour of Barbara Windsor.

References

External links
 

1972 births
Living people
People from Westminster
English male film actors
English male television actors
English male voice actors
20th-century British male actors
21st-century British male actors
Alumni of the Anna Scher Theatre School
English people of French descent